Spuriopimpinella brachycarpa (Nakai) Kitag. (known formerly as Pimpinella brachycarpa) (common names chamnamul and short-fruit pimpinella) is a species in the genus Spuriopimpinella (family Apiaceae). It is a scented plant with saw-toothed, oval leaves, which bears white flowers between June and August, and edible baby leaves.

Culinary use 
Like many other species belonging to the family Apiaceae, chamnamul has aromatic leaves and is used as a culinary herb.

Korea 
In Korean cuisine, the smooth leaves and crunchy stems of young chamnamul are served fresh or balanced as a spring namul (seasoned herbal vegetable dish). In North Korea, chamnamul-kimchi is a popular dish, known as one of Kim Il-sung's favourite. Recently in South Korea, chamnamul is one of the ingredients that frequently feature in Korean-style western food recipes, such as chamnamul pasta or chamnamul pesto.

References 

brachycarpa
Korean vegetables
Namul